Pasquale Bellonio (1698 – 1786) was an Italian painter of the late-Baroque. He was born in Ortona, province of Chieti, Abruzzo, and painted sacred subjects in a provincial late Baroque art style. There are works by him in the Museo Diocesano of Lanciano, the Museo Diocesano of Ortona and the church of Santa Maria Maggiore in Casoli.

References

Italian Baroque painters
1698 births
1768 deaths
People from the Province of Chieti
Ortona
Italian male painters
18th-century Italian painters
18th-century Italian male artists